Kungursky District is an administrative district (raion) of Perm Krai, Russia; one of the thirty-three in the krai. Within the framework of municipal divisions, it is incorporated as Kungursky Municipal District. It is located in the southern central part of the krai and borders with the territories of the towns of krai significance of Chusovoy in the north and Lysva in the northeast, Beryozovsky, Suksunsky, and Kishertsky Districts in the east, Ordinsky and Uinsky Districts in the south, Bardymsky District in the southwest, Osinsky District in the west, and with Permsky District in the north. Its administrative center is the town of Kungur (which is not administratively a part of the district). Population:

Geography
Main rivers in the district include the Sylva, the Iren, the Shakva, and the Babka. There are deposits of gas, oil, anhydrite, and gypsum in the district. There are many caves in the district, of which the most famous is the Kungur Ice Cave—a popular tourist landmark. A significant portion of the district's territory is covered by forests. Climate is temperate continental.

History
The district was established in November 1923. It became a part of Perm Oblast in October 1938.

Administrative and municipal status
Within the framework of administrative divisions, Kungursky District is one of the thirty-three in the krai. The town of Kungur serves as its administrative center, despite being incorporated separately as a town of krai significance—an administrative unit with the status equal to that of the districts.

As a municipal division, the district is incorporated as Kungursky Municipal District. The town of krai significance of Kungur is incorporated separately from the district as Kungur Urban Okrug.

Demographics
As of the 2002 Census, the predominant ethnicities were Russians at 87.8% and Tatars at 9.2%.

Economy
The economy of the district is mostly based on agriculture, mining, and food industry.

Notable residents 

Nikolai Saksonov (1923–2011), Russian weightlifter, born in Serga

References

Notes

Sources

External links
 

Districts of Perm Krai
States and territories established in 1923